Hanyang District forms part of the urban core of and is one of 13 urban districts of the prefecture-level city of Wuhan, the capital of Hubei Province, China. Currently, it is a district and stands between the Han River (right/southern bank) and the Yangtze River (left/northwestern bank), where the former drains into the latter. It is connected by bridges with its former sister cities, Hankou and Wuchang. Presently, on the left bank of the Yangtze, it borders the districts of Qiaokou to the north across the Han River, Jianghan to the northeast, Caidian to the southwest, and Dongxihu to the northwest; on the opposite bank it borders Wuchang and Hongshan. Guiyuan Temple is located in Hanyang.

The name "Hanyang" means "the Yang side of Han River", referring to the town's historic location on the north ("yang") bank of the Han River mouth. However, the lower Han River changed course to the north side of the town during Ming dynasty's Chenghua-era. The town, now on the south ("yin") side of the river, should have been renamed to "Hanyin" by naming convention, but the name "Hanyang" remained as it was well-established since the Sui dynasty.

The Hanyang Arsenal is known for its production of the so-called "Hanyang rifle" - an indigenous Asian copy of the German Model 1888 Commission Rifle, which was heavily used in World War II, as well as in the Korean War and Vietnam War.

Geography

Administrative divisions

As of 2016, Hanyang District administers eleven subdistricts, one economic development zone and one administrative committee:

Education
Colleges and universities:
 Jianghan University

Primary and secondary schools:
 Wuhan French International School

Gallery

References

External links

  Official website of Hanyang District Government

County-level divisions of Hubei
Geography of Wuhan